Redstone may refer to:

Military
 Redstone Arsenal, Alabama, a U.S. Army base
 Redstone (rocket family), a U.S. missile and support system, named for the Arsenal
 PGM-11 Redstone, U.S. missile and carrier rocket, namesake of the family
 USNS Redstone (T-AGM-20), a tracking/communications ship supporting the Apollo program 
 Redstone Old Fort, an 18th-century military post in western Pennsylvania

Places and structures
 Redstone, Colorado
 Redstone Old Fort, a fort
 Redstone, New Hampshire, site of abandoned "red granite" quarry
 Redstone Building, San Francisco, California
 Redstone (Dubuque, Iowa), a historic home
 Redstone Creek (Pennsylvania), a historic creek in the U.S. state of Pennsylvania
 Brownsville, Pennsylvania, known as "Redstone" when it was a notable 18th-century frontier town
 Redstone Township, Fayette County, Pennsylvania
 Redstone (Burlington, Vermont), a historic estate
 Redstone, British Columbia, a settlement in the Chilcotin District of British Columbia, Canada
 Redstone Flat Indian Reserve No. 1, an Indian Reserve near Redstone, British Columbia
 Redstone Flat Indian Reserve No. 1A, an Indian Reserve near Redstone, British Columbia
 Redstone Cemetery Indian Reserve No. 1B, an Indian Reserve near Redstone, British Columbia
 Redstone, Telopea, a heritage-listed house at 34 Adderton Road, Telopea, New South Wales
 Presbytery of Redstone
 Redstone, Calgary, a neighbourhood in the northeast quadrant of Calgary, Alberta, Canada

People
 Brent Redstone (b. c. 1951), American heir and businessman
 Michael Redstone (1902–1987), American businessman
 Peter William Redstone (1936–2016), English harpsichord maker
 Shari Redstone (b. 1954), American heiress, businesswoman, and philanthropist
 Sumner Redstone (1923–2020), American media magnate
 Willy Redstone orig. Rottenstein (1883–1949), French composer in England and Australia
 Jeff Locke (b. 1987), American professional baseball pitcher nicknamed "The Redstone Rocket"

Literature and media
 Redstone (comics), a Marvel Comics super villain
 Redstone (Watership Down), a warren in the animated television series Watership Down
 Redstone Science Fiction, an online science fiction magazine

Gaming
 Redstone, a fictional mineral in the video game Minecraft
 Redstone, a fictional mineral in the video game Savage: The Battle for Newerth
 Redstone, a fictional mineral classification in the video game Final Fantasy XV

Computing
 Redstone, the codename of the versions of Windows 10 released from 2016 to 2018